The Captains of Industry were a British group, formed by former Stiff Records performer Wreckless Eric. The group was managed by the Clash's former road manager, Johnny Green.

In 1985, the group released an album, A Roomful of Monkeys on Go! Discs Records. Shortly after the release of the album they broke up, after the band lost most of its original members.

Discography

Albums
A Roomful of Monkeys (Go! Discs #AGO LP5) (1985)
"Land of the Faint at Heart"
"Our Neck of the Woods"
"Julie Home & Away"
"The Lucky Ones"
"Reputation (A Serious Case of A)"
"Food Factory"
"Lifeline"
"Lady of the Manor"
"Playtime Is Over"

Singles
"Lifeline" b/w "Girl in a Million" (co-written with Syd Geary)

External links
Wreckless Eric website
Wreckless Eric interview: Tupica, Rich
Wreckless Eric discography

British pub rock music groups